is a funding project by the Japanese government that began in 2014.  The project aims to enhance the globalization of the country's public and private universities so that graduates can "walk into positions of global leadership". The project is sometimes referred to as 'TGUP'; it has also been (mis)translated directly in English as "Super Global Universities", and therefore referred to on some university websites as 'SGU' or 'SGUP'.

History
The Top Global Universities Project was launched in 2014, as the latest in a series of education ministry-led project initiatives to internationalize higher education in Japan and increase student mobility. An early, major project in this series started in 2009, when the Japanese Ministry of Education, Culture, Sports, Science and Technology (MEXT) began a program to encourage foreign students to study at Japanese universities.  The program was called Global 30.  Thirteen universities participated by creating and offering English-only undergraduate programs.  It was felt that English-only programs would encourage foreign students to study in Japan.  Studying Japanese was an option, but not a requirement.  The program was concluded in 2014 and replaced with the Top Global University project, which shifted the focus off English-language offerings, but still maintains strong implications of increased English medium instruction in Japanese universities. Along the way, other major projects included The Re-inventing Japan project (2011-present), which was designed to promote Japanese students going abroad and international students coming to Japan, and foster globally-active human resources (known as global jinzai); and the Go Global Japan project (2012-2016), which was designed to encourage Japanese students to study abroad.

Program 
The Top Global University Project began as an initiative of Prime Minister Shinzō Abe, who stated its aim was to help more of Japan's universities rank in the top 100 worldwide.  This requires the hiring of more foreign professors and increasing foreign student attendance at Japanese universities. According to Martin Ince of QS World University Rankings, Prime Minister Abe stated, "the number of foreign students at a university will define its success".

The program is slated to run from 2014 to 2023. Its total budget is ¥7.7 billion ($US 77 million). The funds will be used to hire faculty who are either foreigners or Japanese nationals who have graduated from foreign universities. Designated universities will also establish curricula for undergraduate degree programs, provide financial support for international students, and actively recruit students worldwide.

The Ministry of Education, Culture, Sports, Science and Technology (MEXT) adopted a two-track approach, ranking institutions in one of two categories.
 Type A (Top Type) - The Top Type is for world-class universities that have the potential to be ranked in the top 100 in world university rankings. Each Type A university will receive ¥420 million ($US 4.2 million) annually.
 Type B (Global Traction Type) - The Global Traction Type is for innovative universities that lead the internationalization of Japanese society, based on continuous improvement.  Each Type B university will receive ¥170 million ($US 1.7 million) annually.

Selected universities 
In September 2014, the ministry announced the selection of 37 schools for the Top Global University Project.

Type A (Top Type)

Type B (Global Traction Type)

References

Lists of universities and colleges in Japan
College and university associations and consortia in Asia